Tang Fong Har (born 1943) is a Singaporean lawyer who was detained on 20 June 1987 by the Singapore government during Operation Spectrum under the Internal Security Act (ISA).

Education 
Tang studied law at the National University of Singapore and graduated in 1980.

Operation Spectrum 
In 1987, Tang was detained by the Internal Security Department (ISD) during Operation Spectrum. She subsequently accused Officer SK Tan of assaulting her during her interrogation and indefinite detention by the Internal Security Department.

Her detention was speculated by many as a means to crush political dissent. In a letter, she states that she was physically abused, kept incommunicado and forced to admit guilt of subversion of state. It is speculated that her opposition to the Newspapers and Printing Presses Act and the Legal Profession (Amendment) Bill during her time at the Law Society of Singapore in 1986 was the reason for her detention. She was later released on 12 September 1987.

In 1988, Tang was granted permission to visit her husband, Peter, a British citizen, in the United Kingdom (UK) between 7 March 1988 to 7 April 1988 but had not returned to Singapore. She was subsequently wanted by the Singapore police for breaching her terms with the ISD for her visit to UK. On 18 April 1988, Tang with eight of the ex-detainees from Operation Spectrum issued a joint statement accusing the government of ill treatment and torture while under detention. They also denied involvement in any conspiracy and alleged that they were pressured into making confessions.

On 8 October 2011, Tang, along with exiled political dissident Francis Seow, publicly addressed a Singapore Democratic Party forum from abroad via teleconference. In the address they advocated abolishing the ISA. The Singapore police were investigating the legality of the event the following day.

Personal life 
Tang and her family currently reside in Hong Kong.

References

External links 
 'Spys' detained under security act
 Hall of Shame
 Court allegations against Teo Soh Lung  citing Tang Fong Har as a co -conspirator
 HUMAN RIGHTS WATCH WORLD REPORT 1989 on Singapore
 Tang Fong Har's absence

Singaporean women lawyers
Singaporean women in politics
Singaporean prisoners and detainees
Prisoners and detainees of Singapore
Living people
Year of birth missing (living people)
Fugitives wanted by Singapore
20th-century Singaporean lawyers